Screven County is a county located in the southeastern part of the U.S. state of Georgia. As of the 2020 census, the population was 14,067. The county seat is Sylvania.

History
The county was created on December 14, 1793, and was named for General James Screven, who died fighting in Georgia during the American Revolutionary War. Some wartime accounts used the alternate spelling of "Scriven" for the general, and the county's name was often spelled that way in its early history, as reflected on 19th-century Georgia maps.

Sylvania became the county seat in 1847, moved from Jacksonborough, by an act of State legislation. Screven County TV

The Screven County Courthouse, built in 1964, is the fourth courthouse to serve Screven County.

Geography
The Savannah River borders the eastern side of the county, and the Ogeechee River borders the southwest portion. Elevation varies to around 40 feet on the Savannah river to 320 feet at the Bay Branch community, located a few miles west of Sylvania. Pine, oak, dogwood, and other trees prevalent to the South can be found in Screven County.

The very northern portion of Screven County, defined by a line running from Girard southeast and parallel to State Route 24 to the South Carolina border, is located in the Middle Savannah River sub-basin of the Savannah River basin. A north-central section of the county, from Sylvania north and centered on Hiltonia, is located in the Brier Creek sub-basin of the same Savannah River basin.  The southern portion of Screven County, from Newington running northwest through Sylvania, is located in the Upper Ogeechee River sub-basin of the Ogeechee River basin.  The remaining southeastern corner of the county is located in the Lower Savannah River sub-basin of the larger Savannah River basin.

Major highways
  U.S. Route 301
  U.S. Route 301 Business
  State Route 17
  State Route 21
  State Route 21 Business
  State Route 24
  State Route 73

Adjacent counties
 Allendale County, South Carolina (north)
 Hampton County, South Carolina (east)
 Effingham County (southeast)
 Bulloch County (southwest)
 Jenkins County (west)
 Burke County (northwest)

Demographics

2000 census
As of the census of 2000, there were 15,374 people, 5,797 households, and 4,104 families living in the county.  The population density was 24 people per square mile (9/km2).  There were 6,853 housing units at an average density of 11 per square mile (4/km2).  The racial makeup of the county was 53.56% White, 45.29% Black or African American, 0.14% Native American, 0.26% Asian, 0.05% Pacific Islander, 0.20% from other races, and 0.49% from two or more races.  0.96% of the population were Hispanic or Latino of any race.

There were 5,797 households, out of which 33.70% had children under the age of 18 living with them, 48.00% were married couples living together, 18.30% had a female householder with no husband present, and 29.20% were non-families. 26.50% of all households were made up of individuals, and 11.40% had someone living alone who was 65 years of age or older.  The average household size was 2.60 and the average family size was 3.14.

In the county, the population was spread out, with 27.90% under the age of 18, 8.90% from 18 to 24, 26.50% from 25 to 44, 22.70% from 45 to 64, and 14.00% who were 65 years of age or older.  The median age was 36 years. For every 100 females there were 91.40 males.  For every 100 females age 18 and over, there were 86.80 males.

The median income for a household in the county was $29,312, and the median income for a family was $34,753. Males had a median income of $30,228 versus $20,154 for females. The per capita income for the county was $13,894.  About 15.50% of families and 20.10% of the population were below the poverty line, including 22.40% of those under age 18 and 25.50% of those age 65 or over.

2010 census
As of the 2010 United States Census, there were 14,593 people, 5,596 households, and 3,854 families living in the county. The racial makeup of the county was 54.6% white, 43.3% black or African American, 0.4% Asian, 0.3% American Indian, 0.3% from other races, and 1.1% from two or more races. Those of Hispanic or Latino origin made up 1.2% of the population. In terms of ancestry, 14.5% were American, 9.3% were Irish, 8.9% were English, and 7.6% were German.

Of the 5,596 households, 34.0% had children under the age of 18 living with them, 45.1% were married couples living together, 18.6% had a female householder with no husband present, 31.1% were non-families, and 27.3% of all households were made up of individuals. The average household size was 2.53 and the average family size was 3.07. The median age was 39.5 years.

The median income for a household in the county was $32,155 and the median income for a family was $44,244. Males had a median income of $32,189 versus $25,480 for females. The per capita income for the county was $16,189. About 14.0% of families and 20.4% of the population were below the poverty line, including 23.4% of those under age 18 and 19.2% of those age 65 or over.

2020 census

As of the 2020 United States census, there were 14,067 people, 5,098 households, and 3,395 families residing in the county.

Communities
 Cooperville
 Dover
 Halcyondale
 Hiltonia
 Millhaven
 Newington
 Oliver
 Rocky Ford
 Sylvania

Notable people
 John Abbot, naturalist, entomologist, wrote The Natural History of the Rarer Lepidopterous Insects of Georgia
 Lee Rogers Berger, explorer, paleoanthropologist
 Edward Junius Black, member of the United States House of Representatives (1839–1841; 1842–1845)
 Bucky Dent, New York Yankees shortstop (born in Savannah) but spent his early years in Sylvania
 Francys Johnson, senior NAACP official
 Macay McBride, Major League Baseball pitcher
 John R. McKinney, Georgia's most decorated World War II hero.
 Louie De Votie Newton, pastor and president of the Southern Baptist Convention
 Sam Sommers former NASCAR Driver. Former Georgia Late Model Racing Champion and Georgia Racing Hall of Fame member.

Politics

See also

 National Register of Historic Places listings in Screven County, Georgia
List of counties in Georgia

References

Dixon Hollingsworth, ed., The History of Screven County, Georgia (Dallas, Tex.: Curtis Media Corporation, 1989).

http://quickfacts.census.gov/qfd/states/13/13251.html

External links
 Screven County Chamber of Commerce

 
Georgia (U.S. state) counties
1793 establishments in Georgia (U.S. state)
Populated places established in 1793